Helen Newberry Joy Hospital & Healthcare Center is a rural health care facility.  Established in 1965, the hospital is located in the Village of 
Newberry in the eastern Upper Peninsula of Michigan.

As a rural hospital, HNJH operates a 25-bed acute care hospital, a same-day clinic, as well as three outlying community clinics in Curtis, Engadine and Manistique. It also offers a full-time Emergency Department, out-patient Surgical Services, and Telehealth (in conjunction with the UP Telehealth Network).  The hospital also provides complete Laboratory and Diagnostic Imaging services; rehabilitation services, including Physical and Occupational Therapy, Speech/Language Pathology, Cardiac Rehab, Health and Wellness Center, and Cardio-Pulmonary Rehab.  A Coumadin Clinic is available on-site, as is an AASM accredited Sleep Center and an out-patient Chemo and Infusion Therapy department.  Attached to HNJH is the Golden Leaves Living Center, a 48-bed long-term care department.

Helen Newberry Joy Hospital is a Critical Access Hospital and a member of the Michigan Health & Hospital Association.

Accreditations and awards 
Michigan Governors Award of Excellence, 2004-2006 
JCAHO Accreditation

References

External links 
 Helen Newberry Joy Hospital official website
 SleepCenters.org HNJH AASM Information

Hospital buildings completed in 1965
Hospitals in Michigan